National Tertiary Route 722, or just Route 722 (or ) is a National Road Route of Costa Rica, located in the Alajuela province.

References

Highways in Costa Rica